The Jeremy River, named after Jeremy Adams, begins at a drainage just north of Holbrook Pond about  east of Gilead, Connecticut and runs for  to the Salmon River in Colchester, Connecticut.

The  route has solid Class II whitewater throughout the run and ends at the Salmon River; however, many paddlers continue along the Salmon River paddling route.

The Norton Paper Mill is located on Jeremy River (in Colchester, Connecticut). It operated from 1895 until the early 1960s, before becoming abandoned by the early 1980s, and falling into disrepair. A fire engulfed the building on July 8, 2012, consuming most of the remaining combustibles (the largely-intact walls being made of brick). The property was purchased by the Town of Colchester in 2015 (for $1), with plans to remove the building and redevelop the site as a public park. The Nature Conservancy in Connecticut removed the adjacent dam in 2016.

Crossings

See also
List of rivers of Connecticut

References

External links
 Connecticut Explorer's Guide Online paddling maps of the Jeremy River

Rivers of Tolland County, Connecticut
Rivers of New London County, Connecticut
Tributaries of the Connecticut River
Rivers of Connecticut